Farangi (before 1927: Οκλεμέζ - Oklemez) is a village in Florina Regional Unit, Macedonia, Greece.

The Greek census (1920) recorded 250 people in the village and in 1923 there were 250 inhabitants who were Muslim. Following the Greek-Turkish population exchange, in 1926 within Oklemez there were 28 refugee families from Asia Minor. The Greek census (1928) recorded 135 village inhabitants. There were 26 refugee families (109 people) in 1928.

References 

Populated places in Florina (regional unit)

Amyntaio